The Asser Christelijke Voetbalvereniging (English Assen Christian Football club), also known as ACV, is a Dutch amateur football club, based in Assen.

History 
The club was founded in 1939.

In 2008, the club was relegated for the first time since 1974 from the Hoofdklasse. After one successful Eerste Klasse season, in 2009 ACV was promoted back to the Hoofdklasse as unbeaten champions. In 2017–18 and in 2020–21 it played in the Derde Divisie.

Honours
Hoofdklasse division title: 9
 1977–78, 1978–79, 1979–80, 1985–86, 1986–87, 1989–90, 1991–92, 1993–94, 2001–02.
Saturday Hoofdklasse title: 3
 1977–78, 1985–86 en 1986–87
National Hoofdklasse title: 2
 1977–78, 1985–86

External links
Official website

Football clubs in the Netherlands
Association football clubs established in 1939
1939 establishments in the Netherlands
Football clubs in Drenthe
Sport in Assen
Asser Christelijke Voetbalvereniging